Catherine O’Loughlin is a camogie player, winner of an All-Star award in 2005 She helped Clare to two All-Ireland Junior finals in three years only to lose both in replays, to Galway in 2003 and Dublin in 2005. She was nominated for a further All Star award in 2004.

References

External links
 Profile in Cúl4kidz magazine

Living people
Clare camogie players
Year of birth missing (living people)